Mumtaz Hussain (1947 – 5 May 2000) was an Indian cricketer. He played 69 first-class matches for Hyderabad between 1966 and 1978.

See also
 List of Hyderabad cricketers

References

External links

"Memories of Mumtaz, and the chinaman's art" by V. Ramnarayan

1947 births
2000 deaths
Indian cricketers
Hyderabad cricketers
Place of birth missing